Yiannis Demetriou (born 23 December 1989) is a Cypriot professional footballer who plays for APEA Akrotiri. He is able to play both as a centre back and as a right full back, as well as a right midfielder.

Club career
Demetriou played on loan for Doxa Katokopias during the 2010–11 season. He returned to Apollon and played in two games for the first half of the season before moving in January 2012 to Cypriot Second Division side EN Parekklisias, again on loan. On 1 June 2012 he renewed his loan contract for another year.

On June 1 2020 he become the statement signing for APEA Akrotiriou in the STOK Elite Division under new owner Jamory Leysner.

References

External links

CFA profile

1989 births
Living people
Cypriot footballers
Cyprus under-21 international footballers
Apollon Limassol FC players
Chalkanoras Idaliou players
Doxa Katokopias FC players
Cypriot First Division players
Association football defenders 
Association football midfielders